Geduldig v. Aiello, 417 U.S. 484 (1974), was an equal protection case in the United States in which the Supreme Court of the United States ruled on whether unfavorable treatment to pregnant women could count as sex discrimination. It held that the denial of insurance benefits for work loss resulting from a normal pregnancy did not violate the Fourteenth Amendment.  The California insurance program at issue did not exclude workers from eligibility based on sex but excluded pregnancy from a list of compensable disabilities. The majority found that even though only women would be directly affected by the administrative decision, the classification of normal pregnancy as non-compensable was not a sex-based classification and so the court would defer to the state so long as it could provide a rational basis for its categorization.

Facts
From 1946, California ran an insurance system to cover private sector employees if temporarily unemployed because of a disability not covered by workmen's compensation. It was funded by contributions deducted from the wages of participating employees, for whom participation was generally mandatory unless they belonged to an approved private insurance plan. Employees who had contributed 1% of a minimum income to the disability fund for one year prior to a period of disability were eligible to receive benefits.  However, certain disabilities would not be covered, including those resulting from commitment for dipsomania, drug addiction, or sexual psychopathy.  In Geduldig, the appellees challenged the further exclusion of certain disabilities resulting from pregnancy, as found in §2626 of the Unemployment Insurance Code: “In no case shall the term ‘disability’ or ‘disabled’ include any injury or illness caused by or arising in connection with pregnancy up to the termination of such pregnancy and for a period of 28 days thereafter.”

The litigation began as two separate class action suits brought by employees who had paid into the state’s disability fund but who had been denied benefits relating to pregnancy-related disabilities.  Three of the employees suffered employment disability after complications that arose during their pregnancies, while the fourth experienced a normal pregnancy which still led to a temporary inability to work.  Carolyn Aiello brought suit in Federal District Court, while Augustina Armendariz, Elizabeth Johnson, and Jacqueline Jaramillo brought suit as a petition for a writ of mandate in the state’s supreme court.  The separate cases were consolidated when the state suit was removed to federal court by the appellant, Dwight Geduldig, Director of the California Department of Human Resources Development.

Initially, the appellees sought to enjoin enforcement of the exclusionary policy, and the District Court, as a divided three-judge panel, granted their motion for summary judgment, holding that the program’s administration violated the Fourteenth Amendment’s Equal Protection Clause and stating that “the exclusion of pregnancy-related disabilities is not based upon a classification having a rational and substantial relationship to a legitimate state purpose.”  The court further denied a motion to stay its judgment pending appeal.  The appellant proceeded to file a similar motion with the Supreme Court, which noted probable jurisdiction of the appeal.

Although three of the appellees brought suit to recover benefits for loss of work after complications from pregnancy (tubal and ectopic pregnancies and a miscarriage), this issue was moot by the time the case reached the Supreme Court due to a decision in another case.  In Rentzer v. California Unemployment Insurance Appeals Board, the state court interpreted the statute as applying only to benefit payments for disabilities resulting from normal pregnancies, thus allowing a woman who had suffered an ectopic pregnancy to recover benefits.  Therefore, the only remaining live controversy in Geduldig was whether appellee Jaramillo and others similarly situated were entitled to benefits for work loss related to normal and generally healthy pregnancy and childbirth.

Judgment
Part II of the majority opinion first laid out the rational basis for the policy as argued by the state.  Justice Stewart focused largely on the economics of the benefit system, which had been operating as a self-supporting system since its inception.  The contribution rate to the disability fund as set struck a balance that allowed the state to cover the health conditions that it had deemed eligible under the program: in the years immediately preceding Geduldig, 90-103% of the disability fund's revenue had been utilized to pay disability and hospital benefits.  Both parties acknowledged that to cover more disability risks would require an increase in the amount of money going into the fund, although they disagreed on the amount this would entail.  The District Court accepted the state's estimate that to cover normal pregnancy and delivery would require the fund to pay out over $100 million more in benefits but found that this would not destroy the solvency of the program, although it would require “reasonable changes in the contribution rate, the maximum benefits allowable, and other variables.”  The state, however, argued that such changes would jeopardize the ability of low-income Californians to participate in the program, and thus it had a rational basis to maintain the system in its existing state.

The majority pointed to Williamson v. Lee Optical, in which the Court found that a legislature could legitimately address problems in phases, prioritizing issues which were most pressing.  The Geduldig majority stated that it would be particularly hesitant to second-guess such prioritization and legislative calculation in regards to social welfare programs, citing the premise in Dandridge v. Williams that the Equal Protection Clause “does not require that a State must choose between attacking every aspect of a problem or not attacking the problem at all.”  California, the majority held, could legitimately and constitutionally decide that it was better to “keep benefit payments at an adequate level for disabilities that are covered, rather than to cover all disabilities inadequately.”

Finally, Stewart's opinion turned to the issue of whether California's rational basis for its policy was sufficient to uphold the state's position.  The majority found in the insurance system no invidious discrimination that would violate the Equal Protection Clause, pointing out that women as a group were still eligible for benefits even though the particular condition of pregnancy might not be covered.  The Court reasoned that there was “no risk from which men are protected and women are not,” and “no risk from which women are protected and men are not.”  As stated in Footnote 20 of the majority opinion,

The program divides potential recipients into two groups-pregnant women and nonpregnant persons. While the first group is exclusively female, the second includes members of both sexes. The fiscal and actuarial benefits of the program thus accrue to members of both sexes.

While the Court acknowledged that only women could undergo the excluded condition, “it does not follow that every legislative classification concerning pregnancy is a sex-based classification.”  Pregnancy was an objectively identifiable characteristic rather than a subjective judgment, and the appellants had made no showing that the state's asserted rationale for the policy was a pretext for invidious discrimination. Thus, California's policy was not one which the Court would subject to the heightened scrutiny that it had used to evaluate cases such as Reed v. Reed and Frontiero v. Richardson, and therefore the rational basis presented by the state was enough to allow the policy to stand.

The majority reversed the lower court's decision and vacated the stay previously granted.

Dissent
Justice Brennan, joined by Justices Douglas and Marshall, dissented from the majority's opinion, arguing that under Reed and Frontiero, intermediate scrutiny was the proper level of review for the issue, and that under this analysis California's classification failed, as the appellants had only set out a rational basis for the state's policy.  The dissenters acknowledged that the fiscal solvency of California's insurance program was a legitimate concern and that to include temporary disabilities resulting from normal pregnancy in the scope of conditions covered by the system would require an increase in the employee contribution, an increase in the yearly contribution ceiling, or state subsidization.  However,

whatever role such monetary considerations may play in traditional equal protection analysis, the State’s interest in preserving the fiscal integrity of its disability insurance program simply cannot render the State’s use of a suspect classification constitutional.

The dissenters pointed out that pregnancy was one of the only common conditions affecting health that was not covered by the broad scope of California's Unemployment Insurance Code, even though the economic results of it might be functionally identical to those of other disabilities, in that wages might be lost due to temporary physical inability to work, and even in healthy individuals, pregnancy, delivery, and post-partum care are costly.

Brennan and the other dissenters viewed the state's policy as “singling out for less favorable treatment a gender-linked disability peculiar to women,” creating a “double standard.”  They interpreted the policy as one in which

a limitation is imposed upon the disabilities for which women workers may recover, while men receive full compensation for all disabilities suffered.  ...In effect, one set of rules is applied to females and another to males.  Such dissimilar treatment of men and women, on the basis of physical characteristics inextricably linked to one sex, inevitably constitutes sex discrimination.

The dissenters expressed dissatisfaction with the majority's explanation for its refusal to apply a higher standard of review in a case involving issues tied to sex.  Brennan, Douglas and Marshall viewed Stewart's opinion as a retreat from recent equal protection decisions and voiced concern that the majority's decision would relegate sex-based classifications to the same “traditional” analysis that had allowed legislation such as that in Muller v. Oregon.

See also
 United States labor law
 List of United States Supreme Court cases, volume 417
 Craig v. Boren
 Gender equality
 List of gender equality lawsuits

Notes

External links
 

United States Supreme Court cases
United States Supreme Court cases of the Burger Court
United States equal protection case law
1974 in United States case law
Gender discrimination lawsuits
Parental leave in the United States
United States labor case law
1974 in women's history